My Life as a Man (1974) is American writer Philip Roth's seventh novel.

Summary
The work is split into two sections: the first section, "Useful Fictions," consisting of two short stories, titled "Salad Days" and "Courting Disaster (or "Serious in the Fifties"), about a character named Nathan Zuckerman, and the second section, "My True Story," which takes the form of a first-person memoir by Peter Tarnopol, a Jewish writer who authored the two stories in the first section.

Themes
My Life as a Man is the first of Roth's work that tackles the issue of the writer's relationship to his work, a theme he would develop in subsequent novels, particularly Operation Shylock.  In his autobiography, Roth reveals that much of Tarnopol's life is based on his own experiences; for example, Roth's destructive marriage to Margaret Martinson, which is portrayed through Tarnopol's relationship with the character of Maureen.

Reception
In The New York Times Book Review, critic Morris Dickstein compared the novel to its predecessor Portnoy's Complaint:
No writer, not even Mailer or Lowell, has contributed more to the confessional climate than Philip Roth. Thanks to "Portnoy's Complaint" a good slice of contemporary fiction seems to come verbatim from the writer's own hours on the couch. This would be a dubious distinction had Roth's book not also boldly altered the tone of our confessional writing, most of which had been lugubrious and realistic, smothered in angst and high-seriousness. Reaching back instead to the raunchy, delirious autobiographical manner of Henry Miller and Céline--indeed, perpetuating an unseemly imitation of the latter's great "Death on the Installment Plan"--Roth pitched his anguish in such a low comic strain that the effect was irresistible. If there has been a funnier novel in the last 10 years, or one that exploits sex, psychoanalysis, and the "family romance" more brilliantly, I don't know what it could be.

...Like Rousseau's "Confessions" and its modern progeny, "My Life as a Man" is reckless in inviting us to review the man rather than the writer: that's part of its appeal. To get the story out Roth is willing to look not only ignoble and self-centered, but also foolish, helpless, even a little ugly (as in Peter's final satisfaction at his wife's death). But if the personal-confessional mode highlights Roth's limitations it also returns him to the day-to-day carnival of human folly that he can describe so ringingly, so comically, even as it goes on tormenting him.

External links
 New York Times Book Review on My Life as a Man

References

1974 American novels
Novels by Philip Roth
Holt, Rinehart and Winston books